Sasha Weemaes (born 9 February 1998) is a Belgian road and track cyclist, who currently rides for UCI ProTeam .

Major results

2015
 Sint-Martinusprijs Kontich
1st  Points classification
1st Stages 3a & 3b
2016
 1st Stage 1 Keizer der Juniores
2017
 2nd  Team pursuit, UEC European Under-23 Track Championships
 10th Grote Prijs Stad Sint-Niklaas
2018
 1st  Time trial, National Under-23 Road Championships
 1st Stage 1 Paris–Arras Tour
 2nd ZLM Tour
 5th Grote Prijs Jean-Pierre Monseré
 6th Grand Prix Criquielion
2019
 6th Bredene Koksijde Classic
 4th De Kustpijl 
2020
 1st Heistse Pijl
 5th Gooikse Pijl
2021
 3rd Elfstedenronde
2022
 2nd Dorpenomloop Rucphen
 2nd Gullegem Koerse
 3rd Trofeo Playa de Palma
 4th Road race, National Road Championships
 4th Elfstedenronde
 5th La Roue Tourangelle
 6th Veenendaal–Veenendaal

References

External links

1998 births
Living people
Belgian male cyclists
Sportspeople from Sint-Niklaas
Cyclists from East Flanders
Belgian track cyclists
21st-century Belgian people